Dream Girl or dreamgirl may refer to:

Film, theater, and television

Film
 The Dream Girl (film), a 1916 American silent drama film directed by Cecil B. DeMille
 Dream Girl (1948 film), an American film adapted from the play by Elmer Rice (see below)
 Dream Girl (1977 film), an Indian Hindi-language film
 Dream Girl (1997 film), a 1997 Pakistani film
 Dream Girl (2009 film), an Indian Oriya-language film
 Dream, Girl (2016 film), a documentary featuring Clara Villarosa
 Dream Girl (2019 film), an Indian Hindi-language film
 Dreamgirls (film), a 2006 film adaptation of the Broadway musical (see below)

Theater
 The Dream Girl (operetta), a 1924 operetta by Victor Herbert, Rida Johnson Young, and Harold R. Atteridge
 Dream Girl (play), a 1945 stage play by Elmer Rice
 Dreamgirls, a 1981 Broadway musical based on Diana Ross and the Supremes

Television
 Dream Girl (TV series), a 2015–2016 Indian drama series

Literature
 Dreamgirl: My Life as a Supreme, a 1986 autobiography by Mary Wilson
 Dream Girl (comics), Nura Nal, a DC Comics superhero

Music

Performers
 Dream Girls (band), a 2011–2015 Taiwanese girl group
 Bobbie Smith and the Dream Girls, a 1950s and 1960s American girl group

Albums
 Dream Girl (album), by Anna of the North, or the title song, 2019
 Dream Girl – The Misconceptions of You, by Shinee, or the title song, 2013
 Dreamgirls: Music from the Motion Picture, 2006
 Dreamgirls: Original Broadway Cast Album, 1982

Songs
 "Dream Girl" (Butrint Imeri and Nimo song), 2019
 "Dream Girl" (Eric Ethridge song), 2020
 "Dreamgirl" (song), by Dave Matthews Band, 2005
 "Dream Girls" (song), by I.O.I, 2016
 "Dream Girl", by Arthur Alexander, 1963
 "Dream Girl", by Basshunter from Now You're Gone – The Album, 2008
 "Dream Girl", by Pierre's Pfantasy Club, 1988
 "Dream Girl", by Davy Jones from David Jones, 1965
 "Dream Girl", by Deli Creeps, 1990
 "Dream Girl", by Idina Menzel and cast from the Cinderella film soundtrack, 2021
 "Dream Girl", by Mark Wynter, competing to represent the United Kingdom in the Eurovision Song Contest 1961
 "Dream Girl", by Mumzy Stranger, 2008
 "Dream Girl", by New Edition from One Love, 2004
 "Dream Girl", by Sean Paul from Tomahawk Technique, 2012

See also 
 Manic Pixie Dream Girl, a stock character in film
 It girl